Gavanlu (also Romanized as Gavanlū and Gavanloo; also known as Kābanlū and Kūnlū) is a village in Kharqan Rural District, in the Central District of Razan County, Hamadan Province, Iran. At the 2006 census, its population was 452, in 116 families.

References 

Populated places in Razan County